This is a list of notable restaurants in Paris, France. It includes a listing of notable cafés.

Restaurants

 Les Ambassadeurs
 L'Ambroisie – Michelin three-starred restaurant
 L'Arpège – earned one star in the Michelin Guide in its first year, and  earned two soon thereafter. It earned three Michelin stars in 1996, which it has maintained since.
 L'As du Fallafel
 L'Astrance
 Bel Canto – chain of restaurants, based in Paris, where singers perform live opera arias for the diners.
 Le Boeuf sur le Toit (cabaret)
 Bouillon – classified as a monument historique since 1989.
 Bouillon Chartier
 Buddha Bar
 Le Chateaubriand
 Le Cinq – opened in 2001 to much fanfare and rapidly achieved 1, 2, then 3 Michelin Red Guide stars under the direction of chef Philippe Legendre before being demoted to 2 stars.
 Clown Bar – opened 1902 near Cirque d'hiver, classed as monument historique in 1995
 Dalloyau
 Les Deux Magots
 Dingo Bar – opened in 1923
 L'Entrecôte
 Fouquet's – founded in 1899
 Le Grand Véfour – opened in the arcades of the Palais-Royal in 1784 by Antoine Aubertot, as the Café de Chartres,. When it lost one of its three Michelin stars under the régime of Guy Martin for the Taittinger Group, it was headline news.
 Chez l'Ami Louis – founded in 1924
 La Tour d'Argent – historic restaurant in Paris that has a rating of one star from the Guide Michelin.
 Lapérouse – established in 1766, the restaurant was awarded the prestigious 3 Michelin stars between 1933 and 1968, although it was briefly 2 stars from 1949 to 1951.
 Le Chat Qui Pêche – jazz club and restaurant founded in the mid-1950s, located in a cellar in rue de la Huchette in the Latin Quarter, on the left bank of the Seine.
 Ledoyen – one of the oldest restaurants in Paris
 Ma Bourgogne – bistro
 Maison dorée – former famous restaurant located at 20 Boulevard des Italiens, Paris
 Man Ray – former restaurant-bar
 Maxim's – founded as a bistro in 1893, it is known for its Art Nouveau interior decor
 L'Opéra restaurant
 Polidor – historic restaurant in the 6th arrondissement of Paris, its predecessor was founded in 1845, and it has had its present name since the beginning of the 20th century.
 La Mère Catherine – brasserie in the 18th arrondissement of Paris, France. It is the oldest restaurant located at place du Tertre.
 Restaurant Guy Savoy
 Taillevent – founded in 1946, it has received Michelin Stars through the years
 Le Train Bleu – designated a Monument Historique in 1972.

Cafés

 Angelina – tea house founded in 1903
 Boughnat – term for a person who moved from rural France to Paris, that was later expanded in meaning to include the sense of Parisian cafés owned by bougnats, which would both sell drinks and deliver coal.
 Brasserie Lipp – established in 1880
 Café Anglais
 Café de Flore
 Café de la Nouvelle Athènes
 Café de la Paix
 Café de la Rotonde
 Café des 2 Moulins
 Café du Tambourin
 Café Procope – has been referred to as the oldest restaurant of Paris in continuous operation
 Café Terminus
 Les Deux Magots
 Le Bal Café
 Le Dôme Café – beginning in the 1900s, it was renowned as an intellectual gathering place. Widely known as "the Anglo-American café."
 Parisian café
 Salon Indien du Grand Café

See also
 Bistro
 French cuisine
 List of French restaurants
 Lists of restaurants

References

External links
 

 
Companies based in Paris
Paris
restaurants